Crassolabium is a genus of nematodes in the family Qudsianematidae.

Species 
Crassolabium aenigmaticum - Crassolabium angulosum - Crassolabium australe - Crassolabium baldum - Crassolabium brachycephalum - Crassolabium circuliferum - Crassolabium confusum - Crassolabium cylindricum - Crassolabium diversum - Crassolabium dogieli - Crassolabium elegans - Crassolabium eroshenkoi - Crassolabium ettersbergense - Crassolabium garhwaliense - Crassolabium goaense - Crassolabium gracile - Crassolabium himalum - Crassolabium kaszabi - Crassolabium lautum - Crassolabium major - Crassolabium malagasi - Crassolabium medianum - Crassolabium montanum - Crassolabium neohimalum - Crassolabium nepalense - Crassolabium nothus - Crassolabium papillatum - Crassolabium paracirculifer - Crassolabium parvulum - Crassolabium persicum - Crassolabium plica - Crassolabium porosum - Crassolabium projectum - Crassolabium pumilum - Crassolabium rhopalocercum - Crassolabium robustum - Crassolabium saccatum - Crassolabium seychellense - Crassolabium tenuistylum - Crassolabium vietnamense

References 

 Jabbari, H. et al. 2012: Description of Crassolabium persicum sp. n. (Nematoda, Dorylaimida, Qudsianematidae), an interesting species from Iran. ZooKeys, 203: 55–63, 
 Tam T. Vu; M. Ciobanu; J. Abolafia; R. Peña-Santiago, 2010: Two remarkable new species of the genus Crassolabium Yeates, 1967 from Vietnam (Nematoda: Dorylaimida: Qudsianematidae). Journal of Natural History 44 (33-34): 2049-2064,

External links 
 

Enoplea genera